Eileen Kennedy may refer to:
Eileen Kennedy (judge), Ireland's first female judge
Eileen Kennedy (nutritionist), former director of the Center for Nutrition Policy and Promotion
Eileen Kennedy-Moore, clinical psychologist and author